The corpus of texts written in the Hittite language is indexed by the Catalogue des Textes Hittites (CTH, since 1971). The catalogue is only a classification of texts; it does not give the texts. One traditionally cites texts by their numbers in CTH. Major sources for studies of selected texts themselves are the books of the StBoT series and the online Textzeugnisse der Hethiter.

CTH numbering scheme

The texts are classified as follows:
Historical Texts (CTH 1–220)
Administrative Texts (CTH 221–290)
Legal Texts (CTH 291–298)
Lexical Texts (CTH 299–309)
Literary Texts (CTH 310–320)
Mythological Texts (CTH 321–370)
Hymns and Prayers (CTH 371–389)
Ritual Texts (CTH 390–500)
Cult Inventory Texts (CTH 501–530)
Omen and Oracle Texts (CTH 531–582)
Vows (CTH 583–590)
Festival Texts (CTH 591–724)
Texts in Other Languages (CTH 725–830)
Texts of Unknown Type (CTH 831–833)

Selected texts
Some Wikipedia articles dedicated to specific Hittite texts follow. More are to be found as sections of other articles.

Old Kingdom
Anitta text
Hittite military oath
Hittite laws (CTH 291–292), also called the Code of the Nesilim
Myth of Illuyanka

New Kingdom
Kikkuli's horse training instructions
Indictment of Madduwatta
Manapa-Tarhunta letter
Milawata letter
Song of Kumarbi
Story of Appu
Tawagalawa letter
Zita (Hittite prince)

See also

Amarna letters
Ugaritic texts

Notes

References
 Gary M. Beckman, Harry A. Hoffner, Hittite diplomatic texts, volume 7 of Writings from the ancient world, Scholars Press, 1999, .

External links
 
  Membership required for some databases. Other databases under construction.
  This database currently contains transliterations and translations of Hittite state treaties, decrees, myths, and rituals.

 
Inscriptions by languages